Richard Nelson Perham, FRS, FMedSci, FRSA (27 April 1937 – 14 February 2015), was an English Professor of molecular biology, and Master of St John's College, Cambridge 2004–07. He was also editor-in-chief of FEBS Journal (Federation of European Biochemical Societies) from 1998 to 2013.

Education
Perham attended Latymer Upper School, then St John's College, Cambridge, where he completed his MA (Cantab), PhD and ScD. Perham then went on to become a MRC scholar at Laboratory of Molecular Biology (LMB), also at Cambridge.

Research and career
Perham was known for his contributions to the chemistry of proteins in multimeric assemblies.

Societies 
Perham was a member of the following organisations and societies:
 1965 Biochemical Society member
 1983 EMBO Member
 1986 Royal Institution for Great Britain member
 1992 Academia Europaea member

Awards and fellowships 
His awards include:
 1971 (EMBO) fellowship Max Planck Institute for Medical Research (Max-Planck-Institut für Medizinische Forschung), Heidelberg
 1984 Fellow of the Royal Society (FRS)
 1988 Fellow of the Royal Society of Arts (FRSA) 
 1993 Max Planck Research Prize
 1998 Novartis Medal and Prize of the  Biochemical Society
 2000 Silver Medal of the Italian Biochemical Society
 2005 Fellowship of the Academy of Medical Sciences (FMedSci)
 2008 Edman Prize International Association of Protein Structure and Proteomics (IAPSAP)
 2011 Diplôme d'Honneur of the Federation of European Biochemical Societies

Selected bibliography

References

1937 births
2015 deaths
Biologists at the University of Cambridge
Alumni of St John's College, Cambridge
English molecular biologists
Fellows of the Academy of Medical Sciences (United Kingdom)
Fellows of the Royal Society
Masters of St John's College, Cambridge
Members of Academia Europaea
People educated at Latymer Upper School